Patrick du Chau (born 9 February 1959) is a Belgian former cyclist. He competed in the team time trial event at the 1980 Summer Olympics.

References

External links
 

1959 births
Living people
Belgian male cyclists
Olympic cyclists of Belgium
Cyclists at the 1980 Summer Olympics
Cyclists from East Flanders
People from Brakel